Out from the Shadow is a 1911 American short silent drama film directed by D. W. Griffith and starring Blanche Sweet.

Cast
 Blanche Sweet as Mrs. Vane
 Edwin August as Mr. Vane
 Jeanie MacPherson as The Young Widow
 Donald Crisp as At Dance
 John T. Dillon as At Dance (as Jack Dillon)
 Joseph Graybill
 Charles Hill Mailes as At Dance
 Alfred Paget as At Dance
 Marion Sunshine as At Dance
 Charles West as At Dance

See also
 D. W. Griffith filmography
 Blanche Sweet filmography

References

External links

1911 films
1911 drama films
1911 short films
Silent American drama films
American silent short films
Biograph Company films
American black-and-white films
Films directed by D. W. Griffith
1910s American films